Zircheshmeh (also Romanized as Zīrcheshmeh) is a village in Shurab Rural District, Veysian District, Dowreh County, Lorestan Province, Iran. At the 2006 census, its population was 126, in 26 families.

References 

Towns and villages in Dowreh County